Hendrik Bolz (born 1988 in Leipzig, Saxony), better known by his stage name Testo, is a German rapper who is signed to the Hamburg label Buback. Together with the rapper grim104 he forms the hip-hop duo Zugezogen Maskulin.

Biography 

Testo was born in Leipzig in 1988 and spent his youth mostly in Stralsund (Mecklenburg-Vorpommern). After graduation, he moved to Berlin, where he did an internship in the editorial office of the website rap.de, under the journalist Marcus Staiger. It was here that he met grim104, with whom he formed the hip-hop duo Zugezogen Maskulin. The first album was released in 2011, and the second in 2015. Besides his work with Zugezogen Maskulin, Testo has also made his own solo EP in 2013, entitled Töte deine Helden (Kill Your Heroes).

Discography 
Albums
 2011: Kauft nicht bei Zugezogenen! (Don't buy from newcomers!) (Free album with grim104 as Zugezogen Maskulin)
 2015: Alles brennt (Everything burns) (with grim104 as Zugezogen Maskulin)

EPs
 2010: Zugezogen Maskulin (Free EP with grim104 as Zugezogen Maskulin)
 2013: Töte deine Helden (Kill Your Heroes)

Singles
 2014: Alles brennt (Everything burns) (with grim104 as Zugezogen Maskulin)
 2014: Endlich wieder Krieg (Finally war again) (with grim104 as Zugezogen Maskulin)
 2015: Plattenbau O.S.T. (Plattenbau O.S.T.) (with Ada Steinberg as Zugezogen Maskulin)

Videos
 2011: Entartete Kunst (Degenerate art) (with grim104 as Zugezogen Maskulin)
 2012: Undercut Tumblrblog (with grim104 as Zugezogen Maskulin)
 2012: Rotkohl (Red cabbage) (with grim104 as Zugezogen Maskulin)
 2012: Maskulin Maskulin (Masculine Masculine) (with 3Plusss, Donetasy and grim104)
 2013: Champagner Für Alle (Champagne For Everyone)
 2013: Töte deine Helden (Kill Your Heroes)
 2013: Keine Ahnung Wo (No Idea Where)
 2014: Alles brennt (Everything burns) (with grim104 as Zugezogen Maskulin)
 2014: Endlich wieder Krieg (Finally war again) (with grim104 as Zugezogen Maskulin)
 2015: Plattenbau O.S.T. (Plattenbau O.S.T.) (with Ada Steinberg as Zugezogen Maskulin)

External links 

 Zugezogen Maskulin on laut.de

References 

1988 births
German rappers
Living people